Montà is a comune (municipality) in the Province of Cuneo in the Italian region Piedmont, located about  southeast of Turin and about  northeast of Cuneo.

Montà borders the following municipalities: Canale, Cellarengo, Cisterna d'Asti, Ferrere, Pralormo, Santo Stefano Roero, and Valfenera.

References

External links
 Official website

Roero
Cities and towns in Piedmont